The 2007 European Ladies' Team Championship took place 10–14 July at Golf Club Castelconturbia in Agrate Conturbia, Italy. It was the 25th women's golf amateur European Ladies' Team Championship.

Venue 
The hosting Golf Club Castelconturbia was refounded in 1984. The three nine-hole courses, situated in Agrate Conturbia, in the Italian region of Piedmont, 60 kilometres north-west of Milan, on land were golf was played 90 years earlier, was designed by Robert Trent Jones Sr. and opened in 1987.

The club had previously twice hosted the Italian Open on the European Tour,  1991 and 1998.

Format 
All participating teams played two qualification rounds of stroke-play with six players, counted the five best scores for each team.

The eight best teams formed flight A, in knock-out match-play over the next three days. The teams were seeded based on their positions after the stroke-play. The first placed team was drawn to play the quarter final against the eight placed team, the second against the seventh, the third against the sixth and the fourth against the fifth. In each match between two nation teams, two 18-hole foursome games and five 18-hole single games were played. Teams were allowed to switch players during the team matches, selecting other players in to the afternoon single games after the morning foursome games. Teams knocked out after the quarter finals played one foursome game and four single games in each of their remaining matches. Games all square after 18 holes were declared halved, if the team match was already decided.

The eight teams placed 9–16 in the qualification stroke-play formed flight B, to play similar knock-out match-play, with one foursome game and four single games to decide their final positions.

Teams 
16 nation teams contested the event. Each team consisted of six players.

Players in teams

Winners 
Defending champions Spain lead  the opening 36-hole qualifying competition, with a score of 14 under par 706, 16 strokes ahead of team Sweden on second place.

Tied individual leaders in the 36-hole stroke-play competition was Emma Cabrera-Bello, Spain, and Anna Nordqvist, Sweden, each with a score of 8 under par 136

Team Spain won the championship, beating Sweden 5–2 in the final and earned their fourth title and third in a row. Team England earned third place, beating Germany 4–3 in the bronze match.

Results 
Qualification round

Team standings

* Note: In the event of a tie the order was determined by the better total non-counting scores.

Individual leaders

 Note: There was no official award for the lowest individual score.

Flight A

Bracket

Final games

* Note: Game all square after 18 holes declared halved, since team match already decided.

Flight B

Bracket

Final standings

Sources:

See also 
 Espirito Santo Trophy – biennial world amateur team golf championship for women organized by the International Golf Federation.
 European Amateur Team Championship – European amateur team golf championship for men organised by the European Golf Association.

References

External links 
 European Golf Association: Results

European Ladies' Team Championship
Golf tournaments in Italy
European Ladies' Team Championship
European Ladies' Team Championship
European Ladies' Team Championship